The 2012 Kagame Interclub Cup was the 37th edition of the Kagame Interclub Cup, which is organised by CECAFA. It began on 14 July and ended on 28 July 2012. Tanzania hosted the tournament for their eleventh time since it officially began in 1974, when they were also hosts. The tournament made Wau Salaam the first South Sudanese club to take part in an international club tournament.

Defending champions Young Africans picked up their fifth title of the competition after beating fellow Tanzanians Azam in the final.

Broadcasting
SuperSport secured official rights to broadcast all games played in the tournament. They used their SS9 (SuperSport 9) and SS9E (SuperSport 9 East) channels.

Participants
On 29 June 2012, the draw for clubs to participate in the tournament was released. Young Africans, the winning team, received a cash prize of US$ 30,000, while the runners-up and third-placed teams, Azam and Vita Club respectively, received cash prizes US$ 20,000 and US$ 10,000 respectively. The budget of the tournament is said to be around US$ 600,000. Matches are being played at the Benjamin Mkapa National Stadium in Dar es Salaam and the Azam Stadium in Chamazi.

The following 11 clubs took part in the competition:

Group A
 Port
 Simba
 U.R.A.
 Vita Club (invited guests)

Group B
 Azam
 Mafunzo
 Tusker

Group C
 A.P.R.
 Atlético Olympic
 Wau Salaam
 Young Africans

Match officials
CECAFA appointed 15 officials to participate in the tournament.
Referees

 Thierry Nkurunziza
 Farah Aden
 Anthony Ogwayo
 Issa Kagabo
 Israel Mujuni
 Dennis Batte
 Waziri Sheha

Assistant referees

 Abdulahi Mahamoud
 Elias Kuloba
 Peter Sabatia
 Simba Honore
 Hamis Changwalu
 Jesse Erasmo
 Musa Balikoowa
 Josephat Bulali

Group stage
The group stage featured 11 teams, with 4 teams in Group A and Group C and 3 in Group B. The matchdays were 14–15, 17–18, 19, 20 and 21 July.

If two or more teams are equal on points on completion of the group matches, the following criteria are applied to determine the rankings (in descending order):
 Number of points obtained in games between the teams involved;
 Goal difference in games between the teams involved;
 Goals scored in games between the teams involved;
 Away goals scored in games between the teams involved;
 Goal difference in all games;
 Goals scored in all games;
 Drawing of lots.

Nine CECAFA associations were represented in the group stage: Tanzania by three clubs and Burundi, Congo DR, Djibouti, Kenya, Rwanda, South Sudan, Uganda and Zanzibar.

Group A

Group B

Group C

Knockout stage
The knockout stage involved the eight teams which advanced from the group stage: the top three teams from Group A and Group C and the top two from Group B.

In this stage, teams play against each other once. The losers of the semi-finals play against each other in the third place playoff where the winners are placed third overall in the entire competition and receive US$ 10,000. The winners of the final receive US$30,000 and the runners-up US$20,000.

Bracket

Quarter-finals
The quarter-finals were played on 23–24 July 2012.

In the first quarter-final, Uganda Revenue Authority, who had lost the 2008 final in to Tusker, faced Armée Patriotique Rwandaise, who had already beaten them 2–1 five years earlier to clinch the title in 2007. The latter won the match 2–1. Mafunzo, in the second quarter-final, were beaten 5–3 on penalties by Young Africans, who are seeking their fifth title in the competition, after the match ended in a 1–1 stalemate after 90 minutes.

Atlético Olympic, making their first appearance at the tournament as only the second Burundian club ever to participate, were edged out 2–1 in the third quarter-final by Vita Club, also competing for their first time. Azam completed a surprise upset in the fourth quarter-final over six-time champions and fellow Tanzanians Simba, beating them 3–1 to advance to the semi-finals.

Semi-finals
The semi-finals will be played on 26 July 2012.

In the first semi-final Vita Club will be up against Azam, both of whom have performed impressively for newcomers in this year's competition, having reached the semi-finals ahead of more experienced clubs.

Armée Patriotique Rwandaise will face Young Africans for a second time in the tournament, having lost 2–0 to them in the group stage.

Third place playoff
The third place playoff was played on 28 July 2012, right before the final.

Final
The final was played on 28 July 2012, right after the third place playoff. To reach the final, in the knockout stage Azam defeated six-time champions Simba and Vita Club, while Young Africans eliminated Mafunzo and Armée Patriotique Rwandaise, whom they had already beaten in the group stage.

Azam, making their first ever appearance at the tournament, were the fifth team from Tanzania to reach the final and the fourth to reach the final with Tanzania as the hosts, the last being defending champions Young Africans in 1986. The match was also the third final in which both finalists were from Tanzania, and the second final hosted by Tanzania in which both finalists were from Tanzania.

 

Match rules
90 minutes.
Penalty shoot-out if scores still level.
Seven named substitutes.
Maximum of three substitutions.

Top scorers
A total of 77 goals was scored by 46 different players in the entire tournament.

See also
2012 CECAFA Cup

References

Kagame Interclub Cup
Kagame Interclub Cup
2012 in Tanzania
International association football competitions hosted by Tanzania